Lassaad Dridi (born 19 April 1977) is a Tunisian football manager and a former player. He is the manager of Libyan club Al-Ahly.

References

1977 births
Living people
Tunisian footballers
Stade Tunisien players
CA Bizertin players
ES Hammam-Sousse players
CS Sfaxien players
Al-Hilal SC (Benghazi) players
Tunisian Ligue Professionnelle 1 players
Tunisian expatriate footballers
Expatriate footballers in Libya
Expatriate football managers in Libya
Tunisian expatriate sportspeople in Libya
Tunisian football managers
ES Hammam-Sousse managers
Stade Tunisien managers
Stade Gabèsien managers
Club Athlétique Bizertin managers
CS Sfaxien managers
US Monastir (football) managers
Club Africain football managers
Étoile Sportive du Sahel managers
Tunisian Ligue Professionnelle 1 managers
Libyan Premier League players
Association football midfielders
Al-Ahly SC (Benghazi) managers